Shining Line is the name of an international Album-oriented rock project born from a collaboration between the Italian musicians Pierpaolo Monti and Amos Monti. They have worked with legendary producer Alessandro Del Vecchio, as well as Italian guitar players Marco "Dandy" D'Andrea and Mario Percudani. The band has also recorded with session musicians Erik Martensson, Robin Beck, Harry Hess, Mikael Erlandsson, Michael Voss, Michael Bormann, and Vinny Burns, amongst others.

Mixed and mastered by Michael Voss in his Kidroom Studios in Germany and released in 2010 by German label Avenue Of Allies Music, the debut album received positive reviews.

In 2011, the Shining Line's backing forces Pierpaolo Monti and Amos Monti started to work together on a new AOR project called Charming Grace, involving in it their label mate Davide "Dave Rox" Barbieri (of Wheels Of Fire). The result of this collaboration is the same-titled debut album, released once again by Avenue Of Allies Music in April 2013.

Track listing
  "Highway of Love" - with Erik Martensson 
  "Amy" - with Harry Hess  
  "Strong Enough" - with Robbie LaBlanc
  "Heaven's Paths" - instrumental
  "Heat of the Light" - with Robin Beck
  "Can't Stop the Rock" - with Mikael Erlandsson
  "The Meaning of my Lonely Words" - with Michael Shotton
  "The Infinity in Us" - with Michael Voss
  "Still in your Heart" - with Sue Willets & Bob Harris
  "Homeless' Lullaby" - with Urlich Carlsson & Carsten Shulz
  "Follow the Stars" - with Phil Vinzent
  "Unbreakable Wire" - with Brunorock, Jack Meille, Graziano De Murtas, Alessandro Del Vecchio
  "Under Silent Walls - Part I " - instrumental
  "Under Silent Walls - Part II" - with Michael Bormann
  "Under Silent Walls - Part III" - instrumental

Personnel

Band members
Pierpaolo Monti - Drums & Percussion
Amos Monti - Bass 
Alessandro Del Vecchio - Keyboards & Backing Vocals
Marco "Dandy" D'Andrea - Guitars
Mario Percudani - Guitars

Full guestlist
Erik Martensson - Vocals
Harry Hess - Vocals
Robbie Lablanc - Vocals
Brian Lablanc - Backing Vocals
Robin Beck - Vocals
Mikael Erlandsson - Vocals
Michael Shotton - Vocals
Elisa Paganelli - Backing Vocals
Michael Voss - Vocals, Guitar Solos
Carsten 'Lizard' Schulz - Vocals
Ulrich Carlsson - Vocals
Bob Harris - Vocals
Sue Willetts - Vocals
Johan Bergquist - Backing Vocals
Phil Vincent - Vocals
Bruno Kraler - Vocals
Jack Meille - Vocals
Graziano 'Il Conte' De Murtas - Vocals
Michael Bormann - Vocals
Michael T. Ross - Keyboards Solo
Douglas R. Docker - Keyboards
Ivan Varsi - Guitars
Tank Palamara - Guitar Solo
Vinny Burns - Guitar Solo
Tommy Ermolli - Guitar Solo
Tim Manford - Guitar Solo
Marko Pavic - Guitar Solo
Matt Filippini - Guitar Solo

References

External links
 Official Website

2010 albums